The 1998 World Rowing Championships were World Rowing Championships that were held from 9 to 18 September 1998 in Cologne, Germany. The World Rowing Championships are organized by FISA, the International Rowing Federation.

Medal summary

Men's events

Women's events

Medal table

References

World Rowing Championships
W
Rowing competitions in Germany
Rowing
World Rowing Championships
Sports competitions in Cologne
World Rowing Championships
1990s in Cologne